David Wilson is a rugby union tighthead prop who played for Premiership side Newcastle Falcons.

Club career
Wilson made his debut for Newcastle Falcons in a 2003 League fixture against Bath Rugby. After struggling to displace teammate Carl Hayman, Wilson joined Bath for the 2009–10 season.

Wilson re-signed with Newcastle Falcons in September 2016. He has now retired from Rugby due to injuries and is a student.

International career
Wilson represented England at the 2006 Under 21 Rugby World Championship. He made his debut for the England Saxons side that defeated Ireland A on 1 February 2008. Wilson made his full England debut against Argentina at Old Trafford on Saturday 6 June in England's 37–15 victory. Wilson scored his first try for England on 15 November 2014 against South Africa.

References

External links

David Wilson profile at Bath Rugby
David Wilson profile at the RFU
David Wilson profile at ESPN Scrum

1985 births
Living people
Rugby union players from South Shields
English rugby union players
England international rugby union players
Rugby union props
Newcastle Falcons players
Bath Rugby players